John Snowden may refer to:

 John M. Snowden (1776–1845), mayor of Pittsburgh City
 John Snowden (bishop), bishop of Cariboo
 John Snowden (sport shooter) (born 1969), sport shooter from New Zealand
 John Cecil (priest) (1558–1626), alias John Snowden, English Roman Catholic priest and spy